Laryssa Kukrycka Lysniak Lauret (August 9, 1939 – July 5, 2015) was an American actress of Ukrainian descent. She worked on Broadway and off Broadway, as well as in television in long-running roles, such as Dr. Karen Werner in The Doctors and for one season of Guiding Light as Simone Morey. Her most notable film role was for Everything Is Illuminated as Lista. In 2013, she took on the role as Pavla in the Netflix original series Orange is the New Black.

Lauret died on July 5, 2015, in New York. At the time of her death, she was married to her husband of over fifty years, Wolodymyr Lysniak. With Lysniak, Lauret had two daughters, Ula and Lada.

Filmography
Guiding Light 
The Parisienne and the Prudes (1964) (Ingrid)
The Doctors (1963 TV series) 
Everything Is Illuminated (film)
Orange Is The New Black
Gods Behaving Badly (film)

References

External links 
 
  FaceBook page Laryssa Lauret
 Lista in Everything is Illuminated
 
 BuzzCinema.com biography

1939 births
2015 deaths
American people of Ukrainian descent